James Fred Hastings (April 10, 1926 – October 24, 2014) was an American radio station executive and a Republican politician from New York.

Early life
Hastings was born on April 10, 1926, in Olean, New York. He graduated from Allegany Central School in 1943, and joined the United States Navy for World War II. After he returned home in 1946 he worked as a carpenter, and then worked as a sales representative for Procter & Gamble.

Hastings later became active in several businesses, including manager and vice president of radio station WHDL from 1952-1966, national advertising manager for the Times Herald newspaper in Olean from 1964-1966, and a partner in the real estate and insurance firm of Hastings & Jewell.

He was a member of the Allegany Town Board from 1953 to 1962, and was the town's police court justice for five years.

Political career
Hastings was a member the New York State Assembly (Cattaraugus Co.) from 1963 to 1965, sitting in the 174th and 175th New York State Legislatures; and a member of the New York State Senate from 1966 to 1968, sitting in the 176th and 177th New York State Legislatures. He was a delegate to the 1968 and 1972 Republican National Conventions.

He was elected as a Republican to the 91st, 92nd, 93rd and 94th United States Congresses, holding office from January 3, 1969, to January 20, 1976, when he resigned to become the president of the Associated Industries trade group in Albany, New York.

Later in 1976, Hastings was indicted for taking kickbacks from three employees while he was a legislator, and using the money to purchase vehicles, snowmobiles, and boats as well as contributing to his children's college tuition and a New York state retirement fund. He was convicted of mail fraud and filing false payroll information in December 1976 and served 14 months in the United States Penitentiary, Allenwood.

Later life
After his release from prison, Hastings lived in retirement in Belleair Beach, Florida until returning to Allegany in 1998.

Death
He died on October 24, 2014, in Allegany, New York.

See also
List of American federal politicians convicted of crimes
List of federal political scandals in the United States

Sources

References

1926 births
2014 deaths
20th-century American politicians
Republican Party members of the New York State Assembly
New York (state) politicians convicted of crimes
Republican Party New York (state) state senators
People from Allegany, New York
People from Olean, New York
Politicians convicted of mail and wire fraud
Republican Party members of the United States House of Representatives from New York (state)